G1000 may refer to:

 Le G1000, a citizens' assembly in Belgium
 Garmin G1000, an integrated flight instrument system 
 Vossloh G1000 BB, a class of diesel-hydraulic locomotives
 Samsung SPH-G1000, is a gaming phone introduced by Samsung

See also:

 Hitachi G1000 (disambiguation)